Stefan Herbst (born 17 May 1978 in Leipzig, Germany) is a 2-time Olympics swimmer from Germany. He swam for Germany at the 2000 and 2004 Olympics. He is the brother of fellow Olympic swimmer Sabine Herbst and uncle of young swimmer Ramon Klenz.

Stefan made his international swimming debut at the 1998 World Championships. He has competed in Freestyle Relay and Men's 200m Freestyle.

References

Swimmers at the 2000 Summer Olympics
Swimmers at the 2008 Summer Olympics
Olympic swimmers of Germany
1978 births
Swimmers from Leipzig
Living people
German male freestyle swimmers
World Aquatics Championships medalists in swimming
Medalists at the FINA World Swimming Championships (25 m)
European Aquatics Championships medalists in swimming
Goodwill Games medalists in swimming
Competitors at the 1998 Goodwill Games